John Noble (4 August 1845 – 20 April 1889) was an English first-class cricketer active 1866–69 who played for Surrey. He was born in Kennington; died in Chelsea, London.

References

1845 births
1889 deaths
English cricketers
Surrey cricketers
Surrey Club cricketers
Gentlemen of the South cricketers
Southgate cricketers